Mahender Nath Sofat is an Indian politician and member of the Bharatiya Janata Party. Sofat was a member of the Himachal Pradesh Legislative Assembly from the Solan constituency in Solan district.

References 

People from Solan district
Himachal Lokhit Party politicians
Bharatiya Janata Party politicians from Himachal Pradesh
Himachal Pradesh MLAs 1990–1992
Living people
21st-century Indian politicians
Year of birth missing (living people)